Manly Surf n Slide re-opened in December 2016 after spending over $150k to upgrade what was the former Manly Waterworks. The Manly Waterworks was a water park in Manly, New South Wales, Australia. It was operated jointly with the Mount Druitt Waterworks and Cairns Waterworks, surviving after the later two became defunct.

Manly Surf n Slide features in the movie BMX Bandits starring Nicole Kidman during which an escape is staged in one of the waterslides.

Attractions
Three waterslides.

References

External links
www.manlysurfnslide.com.au

Water parks in New South Wales
Tourist attractions in Sydney
Defunct amusement parks in Australia
Manly, New South Wales